Christian Ritter (probably 1645 to 1650 – probably after 1725) was a composer and organist of the North German organ school.

Biography
Ritter was probably a pupil of Christoph Bernhard in Dresden. A notice on one of his works described him as Kammerorganist (chamber organist) in Halle in 1666, although this position does not appear in the records until 1672. In 1677 he was the Hoforganist (court organist). The composer David Pohle was Kapellmeister at Halle during these years. Ritter may have left Halle in 1677 as in that year the position of Kammerorganist was filled by Johann Philipp Krieger.

Some years later he went to Sweden. In 1681 he was mentioned on a record of the Stockholm court, a year later as deputy Kapellmeister. Ritter went back to Dresden in 1683 and was Kammerorganist and deputy Kapellmeister under Christoph Bernhard. In 1688 he was evidently back in Stockholm as Kapellmeister, remaining there until 1699. According to a detail on a vocal work, Ritter was living in Hamburg in 1704.

In 1717 he described himself in a letter to Johann Mattheson as "Emeritus, who did his part at the royal, electoral and princely courts for more than 30 years in re musica".

Works
As well as more than 20 sacred vocal works, a few organ and keyboard works survive. Best known among his sacred works is O amantissime sponse Jesu, a cantata for soprano and five stringed instruments.

A number of musicologists, amongst them Hans Joachim Moser and Richard Buchmayer, author of the first major study on Ritter, assess his compositions as being of exceptionally high quality.

References

Sources

External links

German Baroque composers
Organists and composers in the North German tradition
German male organists
German classical organists
18th-century keyboardists
18th-century classical composers
German male classical composers
18th-century German composers
18th-century German male musicians
17th-century births
18th-century deaths
Year of birth unknown
Year of death unknown
Male classical organists